The Battle of Faesulae was fought in 406 AD as part of the Gothic invasion of the Western Roman Empire. After General Flavius Stilicho repelled the Visigoths at Pollentia and Verona, he encountered a new incursion of Vandals and Goths led by Radagaisus whose forces attacked Florence. Stilicho ultimately defeated the invaders at Faesulae (modern Fiesole) with support from Uldin the Hun and Sarus the Goth. Radagaisus was executed after the battle and survivors of his armies fled to Alaric.

Background 

In late 405 or early 406, King Radagaisus crossed the Alps and marched into Italy with a large Germanic and Alani force. After overrunning the undefended Raetia and northern Italy, heavily devastating the fertile countryside, they halted to besiege Florence, only 180 miles north of Rome. Stilicho, Master-General of the west, hastily gathered forces for the defense of Italy, enrolling in his service a tribe of the Alani, and numbers of the Goths under Sarus and the Huns under Uldin, his army amounting to some 20,000 Romans and Foederati soldiers. Radagaisus, by comparison, who likewise had in his army miscellaneous detachments of Goths and Alani, had as many as 20,000 barbarian warriors at his back, amounting, together with wives, slaves, and children, to between 50,000 and 100,000.

The battle 
While Stilicho had been collecting his army, the small garrison of Florence had held out against the vast army encamped outside their walls. As soon as Stilicho arrived with his army of relief, he contrived to smuggle desperately needed supplies and reinforcements into the beleaguered city. But instead of attempting to crush Radagaisus' army in an open battle, Stilicho adopted a more lengthy, though ultimately successful, course of action. After surrounding the barbarians with rudimentary entrenchments, he brought in thousands of the native people to aid in the construction of a more systematic entrenchment of the lines enclosing Radagisus' camp. Although the barbarians made repeated efforts to break out while the work was still in progress, the Romans were able to repulse every attempt due to a lack of proper coordination amongst Radagaisus' forces, whose assaults were individual to each band and made in small numbers. After the lines of circumvallation were completed Radagaisus admitted the hopelessness of his situation, trapped as he was in the midst of enemy territory with no provisions and a vast number of non-combatants in need of subsistence. On August 23 he left his camp to capitulate in the tent of Stilicho. Though he had been promised equitable terms, or even an equal alliance by Stilicho, the latter immediately proceeded to behead him, thus emerging supremely victorious and being once again hailed as the “savior of Italy”.

Aftermath 
Although Stilicho had halted the invasion by the execution of its leader and momentarily averted the collapse of the Empire, the issue was, in fact, less decisive than apparent since he was incapable of utterly destroying the enormous army of Radagaisus, and the barbarian survivors were not likely to return north to again confront their more savage Asian enemies, the Huns. Instead, a large detachment of the remnants of Radagaisus' army, comprising Suevi, Vandals, Alans, and Burgundians, to a number of over 100,000 escaped north over the Alps, only to reappear on the frontiers of Gaul, which had been stripped of its defenders by Stilicho in 401 to meet Alaric's inroad into Italy at that time. Although initially resisted by the Franks and other Roman foederati, the barbarians were soon able to devastate or conquer Gaul, which southwestern area (Aquitania) was lost at this point, never to be recovered by the western empire. In the words of Gibbon, “This memorable passage of the Suevi, etc. may be considered as the fall of the western empire beyond the Alps, and the barriers, which had so long separated the savage and the civilized nations of the earth, were from that fatal moment leveled with the ground”. In fact, however, Roman rule in Gaul survived in the north for another 80 years in the Roman domain of Soissons until 486. Roman Armorica, also, was never overrun by the German barbarians and would welcome Romano-Britons who would rule the area as Brittany for another 1,000 years until 1486.

References

Bibliography

406
400s conflicts
Faesulae
Faesulae
Faesulae
Faesulae
Faesulae
Battles in Tuscany
5th century in Italy
400s in the Roman Empire